The Asia Pacific Network of Science & Technology Centres (ASPAC), is a not-for-profit association initiated in 1997.

It was formed to facilitate communication and cooperation among Science Centres and Museums and other organisations that use interactive approaches for learning and public understanding of science and technology in the Asia-Pacific region.

ASPAC has over 50 members from 20 countries (2022). Members include different forms of organisations, like science centres, science museums, children’s museums, exhibit design and fabrication firms.

References

External links 
 ASPAC website

International scientific organizations
Museum associations and consortia
Organizations established in 1997
Science centers
Science museums
Technology museums